9th Wonder of the World is Witchdoctor's 2nd album, released in 2000.

Track listing
Source: Amazon

Credits
Producers: Witchdoctor, Organized Noize, Rated R Music Group, Dough Boy, Nucleus Productions, & Back Woods Productions.

References

2000 albums
Witchdoctor (rapper) albums